Tarqumiyah is a Palestinian city located 12 kilometers northwest of Hebron, in the southern West Bank, in the Hebron Governorate of the State of Palestine.

History
Tarqumiyah  is an ancient town situated on a rocky hill. Cisterns have been found here.
According to  the PEF's Survey of Western Palestine (SWP), this place is the early Christian Tricomias, an episcopal see.

Ottoman era
Tarqumiya, like the rest of Palestine, was incorporated into the Ottoman Empire in 1517, and in the census of 1596 the village appeared  to be in the Nahiya of Halil of the Liwa of Quds. It had a population of 17 families, all Muslim. They paid a fixed tax-rate of 33,33% on agricultural products, including wheat, barley,  olive trees, goats and beehives, in addition to occasional revenues; a total of 6,500 akçe.

In 1838 Edward Robinson passed by and noted that Tarqumiya was on the most common path from Gaza, via Bayt Jibrin to Hebron. While resting at  Tarqumiya, he was visited by the local Sheikh and other dignitaries,  who “demeaned themselves kindly and courteously." He further noted it  as a Muslim village, between the mountains and Gaza, but subject to the government of el-Khulil. 

In 1863 Victor Guérin found it to have 400 inhabitants, while an Ottoman village list from about 1870 counted 45 houses and a population of 108, though the population count included men, only.

In 1883 SWP described Tarqumiyah as “A small village on a rocky hill near the low lands. On the east, about a mile distant, is a spring; on the south are olives.”

British Mandate era
According to the 1922 census of Palestine conducted  by the British Mandate authorities, Tarqumiyah had a population of 976 inhabitants, all Muslims,  increasing in the 1931 census to 1,173, still entirely Muslim, in 225 inhabited houses.

In  the 1945 statistics  the population of Tarqumiya was 1,550 Muslims, and the total land area was  21,188 dunams of land according to an official land and population survey. 1,029 dunams were plantations and irrigable land, 6,614 were used for cereals, while 152 dunams were built-up (urban) land.

Jordanian era
In the wake of the 1948 Arab–Israeli War, and after the 1949 Armistice Agreements, Tarqumiyah came  under Jordanian rule.

In 1961, the population of Tarqumiyah was  2,651.

Post-1967
Since the Six-Day War in 1967, Tarqumiyah has been under Israeli occupation. The population in the 1967 census conducted by the Israeli authorities was 2,412. Israel has expropriated land from Tarqumiyah in order to construct two Israeli settlements: Telem and Adora.

Since 1995, Tarqumiyah has been governed by the Palestinian National Authority as part of Area B of the West Bank. According to the Palestinian Central Bureau of Statistics, the town had a population of over 14,357 in 2007.

Footnotes

Bibliography

External links
Welcome To Tarqumiya
Tarqumya, Welcome to Palestine
Survey of Western Palestine, Map 21:    IAA, Wikimedia commons 
Tarqumiya Town (fact sheet),  Applied Research Institute–Jerusalem, ARIJ
Tarqumiya Town Profile, ARIJ
Tarqumiya - aerial photo, ARIJ
The priorities and needs for development in Tarqumiya town based on the community and local authorities' assessment, ARIJ

Cities in the West Bank
Hebron Governorate
Municipalities of the State of Palestine